Evren is a Turkish word meaning universe or cosmos. It may refer to:

Mythology
 A dragon in Turkic mythology

People

Given name
 Evren Büker (born 1985), Turkish basketball player
 Evren Cagiran (born 1993), Turkish compound archer
 Evren Celimli (born 1971), American composer
 Evren Eren Elmalı (born 2000), Turkish footballer
 Evren Erdeniz (born 1983), Turkish footballer
 Evren Korkmaz (born 1997), Turkish footballer
 Evren Ozdemir (born 1977), Turkish-Canadian musical artist
 Evren Özyiğit (born 1986), Turkish footballer

Surname
 Agnès Evren (born 1970), French politician
 Ahi Evren (1169–1261), Turkish Muslim preacher
 Burçak Evren (born 1947), Turkish film historian, author, journalist, researcher, and film critic
 Kenan Evren (1917–2015), seventh President of Turkey
 Sekine Evren (1922–1982), seventh First Lady of Turkey
 Süreyya Evren (born 1972), Turkish anarchist

Places
 Evren, Ankara, a town and district of Ankara Province
 Evren, Mut, a village in Mut district of Mersin Province

Turkish given names